18th SDFCS Awards
December 11, 2013

Best Film: 
Her

Best Director: 
Alfonso Cuarón
Gravity

The 18th San Diego Film Critics Society Awards were announced on December 11, 2013.

Winners and nominees

Best Actor
Oscar Isaac – Inside Llewyn Davis
Chiwetel Ejiofor – 12 Years a Slave
Tom Hanks – Captain Phillips
Matthew McConaughey – Dallas Buyers Club
Joaquin Phoenix – Her

Best Actress
Cate Blanchett – Blue Jasmine
Sandra Bullock – Gravity
Adèle Exarchopoulos – Blue Is the Warmest Colour
Brie Larson – Short Term 12
Emma Thompson – Saving Mr. Banks

Best Animated Film
The Wind Rises
The Croods
Despicable Me 2
Frozen
Get a Horse!

Best Cinematography
To the Wonder – Emmanuel LubezkiGravity – Emmanuel Lubezki
The Great Gatsby – Simon Duggan
Inside Llewyn Davis – Bruno Delbonnel
Prisoners – Roger Deakins

Best DirectorAlfonso Cuarón – Gravity
Joel Coen and Ethan Coen – Inside Llewyn Davis
Destin Daniel Cretton – Short Term 12
Spike Jonze – Her
Steve McQueen – 12 Years a Slave

Best Documentary
The Act of Killing
20 Feet from Stardom
Blackfish
Let the Fire Burn
Stories We Tell

Best Editing
Captain Phillips – Christopher Rouse12 Years a Slave – Joe Walker
Gravity – Alfonso Cuarón and Mark Sanger
Her – Eric Zumbrunnen and Jeff Buchanan
The Hunger Games: Catching Fire – Alan Edward Bell

Best Ensemble PerformanceAmerican Hustle
12 Years a Slave
Prisoners
Short Term 12
The Way, Way Back

Best Film
Her
12 Years a Slave
Gravity
Inside Llewyn Davis
Short Term 12

Best Foreign Language Film
Drug War • China / Hong KongBlue Is the Warmest Colour • Belgium / France / Spain
The Broken Circle Breakdown • Belgium / Netherlands
The Hunt • Denmark / Sweden
No • Chile / France / Mexico / United States

Best Production DesignThe Great Gatsby – Catherine Martin and Karen Murphy12 Years a Slave – Adam Stockhausen
Gravity – Andy Nicholson
Her – K. K. Barrett
Saving Mr. Banks – Michael Corenblith

Best ScoreHer – Arcade Fire12 Years a Slave – Hans Zimmer
The Broken Circle Breakdown – Bjorn Eriksson
Gravity – Steven Price
Rush – Hans Zimmer

Best Original ScreenplayHer – Spike JonzeBlue Jasmine – Woody Allen
Enough Said – Nicole Holofcener
Inside Llewyn Davis – Joel Coen and Ethan Coen
Prisoners – Aaron Guzikowski

Best Adapted ScreenplayBefore Midnight – Richard Linklater, Julie Delpy, and Ethan Hawke12 Years a Slave – John Ridley
Captain Phillips – Billy Ray
Short Term 12 – Destin Daniel Cretton
The Spectacular Now – Scott Neustadter and Michael H. Weber

Best Supporting ActorJared Leto – Dallas Buyers Club
Daniel Brühl – Rush
Michael Fassbender – 12 Years a Slave
James Gandolfini – Enough Said
Sam Rockwell – The Way, Way Back

Best Supporting Actress
Shailene Woodley – The Spectacular Now
Elizabeth Banks – The Hunger Games: Catching Fire
Sally Hawkins – Blue Jasmine
Jennifer Lawrence – American Hustle
Lupita Nyong'o – 12 Years a Slave

References

External links
 Official Site

2
2013 film awards
2013 in American cinema